Vítor da Fonseca (born 3 April 1946) is a Portuguese former butterfly swimmer. He competed in the men's 200 metre butterfly at the 1964 Summer Olympics.

References

External links
 

1946 births
Living people
Portuguese male butterfly swimmers
Olympic swimmers of Portugal
Swimmers at the 1964 Summer Olympics
Place of birth missing (living people)